Wiwersheim is a commune in the Bas-Rhin department in Grand Est in north-eastern France.

On 23 November 1944, General Leclerc gathered his staff in the town hall of the village to finalize the last adjustments before the final 2nd Armored Division assault to liberate Strasbourg.

Population

See also
 Communes of the Bas-Rhin department
 Kochersberg

References

Communes of Bas-Rhin